Louis Gatewood (December 22, 1886 – death date unknown) was an American Negro league shortstop in the 1900s.

A native of Madison, Indiana, Gatewood played for the Indianapolis ABCs in 1908. In three recorded games, he posted one hit in 12 plate appearances.

References

External links
Baseball statistics and player information from Baseball-Reference Black Baseball Stats and Seamheads

1886 births
Year of death missing
Place of death missing
Indianapolis ABCs players